The 2014 season was FC Kansas City's second season of existence. The team competes in the National Women's Soccer League, the top division of women's soccer in the United States.

Club

Roster 
As of April 27, 2014.

Team management 
FC Kansas City's ownership group is composed of Chris, Brad and Greg Likens, and Brian Budzinski. The group also owns the Missouri Comets of the Major Indoor Soccer League. Budzinski is also owner of the Kansas City Soccerdome. Vlatko Andonovski, a former professional player and head coach of the Kansas City Kings of the PASL and Missouri Olympic Development Program (ODP), was head coach for the 2013 season.

Match results

Preseason

NWSL

Regular season 
Kickoff times are in CDT (UTC-05)

Regular-season standings

Results summary

NWSL Championship Playoffs

Semi-final

Championship

Squad statistics
Note: only regular season squad statistics displayed.

Key to positions: FW – Forward, MF – Midfielder, DF – Defender, GK – Goalkeeper

References 

FC Kansas City seasons
FC Kansas City
FC Kansas City
FC Kansas City